Ludwig Wieden (10 November 1869 – 20 August 1947) was an Austrian painter. His work was part of the painting event in the art competition at the 1928 Summer Olympics.

References

1869 births
1947 deaths
20th-century Austrian painters
Austrian male painters
Olympic competitors in art competitions
People from Svitavy District
20th-century Austrian male artists